Warren Eric Loving (born November 12, 1960) is a former professional American football running back who played for the Buffalo Bills of the National Football League in 1987. He appeared in two games as part of the Bills' replacement team during the 1987 players' strike. Loving previously participated in the Miami Dolphins training camp before the 1986 NFL season, and was signed by the New York Jets before being cut in September 1987. 

Raised in Jersey City, New Jersey, Loving attended James J. Ferris High School.

References

External links
Pro-Football-Reference

1960 births
Living people
American football running backs
Buffalo Bills players
James J. Ferris High School alumni
William Penn Statesmen football players
Players of American football from Jersey City, New Jersey